Exeter Chiefs Women are a professional women's rugby union team based in Exeter, Devon, England. They were founded in 2019 to take part in the Premier 15s, the top level of English women's rugby. They are based at Sandy Park and are affiliated to Premiership Rugby's Exeter Chiefs. The side is coached by Head Coach, Susie Appleby. Kate Zackary and Poppy Leitch operate as co-captains of the side.

Creation 
The creation of Exeter Chiefs Women was announced in September 2019 with former England women's national rugby union team players Susie Appleby and Amy Garnett announced as their first coaches. Exeter Chiefs announced they would be spending £500,000 to set up the women's team ahead of a scheduled audit of the Premier 15s by the Rugby Football Union (RFU) in the hopes they would be able to apply for a place in the league. Their intent was to increase participation in rugby in Devon and Cornwall.

In April 2020, as part of the review of the Premier 15s by the RFU, Exeter Chiefs Women were offered a place in the 2020-21 Premier 15s alongside Sale Sharks Women. The move attracted controversy as Exeter and Sale gained their places at the expense of Waterloo Ladies and Richmond Women, the latter of which was one of the most historically successful clubs in women's rugby. They were also criticised for not earning their place by promotion however some women's rugby analysts argued that women's rugby needed clubs that had the backing of professional men's sides in order to be viable in the long term.

In their debut season, the side finished 6th in the Premier 15s. In their second season, they reached the first final in their history, against Harlequins Women in the Allianz Cup.

Premier 15s 
Upon announcement of the team joining the Premier 15s, player recruitment was limited due to the COVID-19 pandemic. A number of internationals from various countries joined the club. They played their first match in the Premier 15s against Gloucester-Hartpury Women.

Squad

Notable players 
The following are players which have represented their countries at the Rugby World Cup whilst playing for Exeter Chiefs:

References 

Women's rugby union teams in England
Rugby clubs established in 2019
Sport in Exeter
Exeter Chiefs